Franklin Western Canales (born April 11, 1972 in New York City, New York ) is a professional basketball player. He is 2.00 m tall and plays as a forward. Western is member of the Dominican Republic national basketball team.

References
 FIBA profile

1972 births
Living people
Dominican Republic men's basketball players
Basketball players at the 2003 Pan American Games
Providence Friars men's basketball players
Power forwards (basketball)
Pan American Games silver medalists for the Dominican Republic
Pan American Games medalists in basketball
Central American and Caribbean Games bronze medalists for the Dominican Republic
Competitors at the 2006 Central American and Caribbean Games
Central American and Caribbean Games medalists in basketball
Medalists at the 2003 Pan American Games